The Songze Culture was a Neolithic culture that existed between 3800 and 3300 BCE in the Lake Tai area near Shanghai.

Dates
Three radiocarbon dates were taken from Songze culture layers at Jiangli near Lake Tai. Two of the dates were obtained from charred rice grains, returning dates of 3360–3090 BCE and 3540–3370 BCE. The third date was taken from knotgrass and produced a date of 3660–3620 BCE. Although it is accepted to be the successor of the Majiabang culture, others have suggested that Songze was a successor phase to the Hemudu culture.

Sites

Songze
In 1957, archaeologists discovered a site north of Songze Village near Zhaoxiang Town  in Shanghai's Qingpu District. Excavations have been conducted throughout 1961, 1974–1976, 1987, 1994–1995, and 2004. These revealed three cultural layers: the most recent had pottery from the Spring and Autumn period; the middle layer was a cemetery with 148 graves and numerous artefacts; the oldest layer belonged to a village of the Majiabang culture.

Nanhebang
92 graves have been excavated from a Songze cemetery at Nanhebang.

Pishan
The Pishan cemetery contained 61 burials.

Dongshan
Dongshan Village is located near Jingang Town 18 km west of Zhangjiagang. It was discovered in 1989 and has undergone excavations by the Suzhou Museum (1989–1990), followed by two large rescue excavations led by the Nanjing Museum in 2008–2009. The site is divided into three areas: area 1 was a small cemetery of 27 burials, all of which had different quantities of grave goods, which has been used to suggest the existence of a stratified society; area 2 was a residential comprising five buildings in the centre of the site; area 3 was another burial ground in the site's west, with 10 tombs.

Notes

References
 
 
 
 
 

Neolithic cultures of China
Yangtze River Delta
History of Jiangsu
History of Shanghai
History of Zhejiang
4th-millennium BC establishments